Sir Peter Ivan Talijancich , generally known as Peter Talley, is a New Zealand businessman, known for his involvement in the fishing and food industries as the Managing Director of Talley's Group. In the 2002 New Year Honours, Talley was appointed as an Officer of the New Zealand Order of Merit, for services to the fishing industry, export and the community, and he was promoted to Knight Companion of the New Zealand Order of Merit, for services to business and philanthropy, in the 2015 Queen's Birthday Honours.

References

Year of birth missing (living people)
Living people
People from Motueka
New Zealand businesspeople
Knights Companion of the New Zealand Order of Merit
New Zealand philanthropists
Businesspeople awarded knighthoods